Apostolos II (Archangelos, 1922 – Rhodes, 22 September 2010), born Panagiotis Dimelis (Παναγιώτης Διμέλης), was the Greek Orthodox metropolitan bishop of Rhodes, Greece from 5 May 1988 until his resignation on 20 April 2004, and before that titular metropolitan of Ilioupolis and Theira in Turkey, from 17 November 1977 until 15 October 1985.

Notes

1922 births
2010 deaths
Orthodox bishops of Rhodes
People from Rhodes